Gómez is a town in Brandsen Partido in Buenos Aires Province, Argentina. It is located in km marker 38 of National Route 215.

Population 
According to the last census the population count was 335 which represents a growth of 58.7% over 211 the previous census.

Gómez or Estación Gómez
This town is misnamed Estación Gómez, as with many towns. Even figure on posters and access roads to it and in telephone directories, for example.

External links 

 Coord and NASA, Google images

Populated places in Buenos Aires Province